Emamzadeh Mohammad may refer to:

Emamzadeh Seyyed Mohammad, Chaharmahal and Bakhtiari
Emamzadeh Mohammad, Khuzestan
Emamzadeh Mohammad, Qazvin